The year 2007 is the 15th year in the history of the Ultimate Fighting Championship (UFC), a mixed martial arts promotion based in the United States. In 2007 the UFC held 19 events beginning with, UFC Fight Night: Evans vs. Salmon.

Title fights

The Ultimate Fighter

Debut UFC fighters

The following fighters fought their first UFC fight in 2007:

Akihiro Gono
Alberto Crane
Allen Berube
Alvin Robinson
Andy Wang
Anthony Johnson
Antônio Rodrigo Nogueira
Ben Saunders
Billy Miles
Brandon Melendez
Brian Geraghty
Chad Reiner
Cole Miller
Colin Robinson
Dan Barrera
Demian Maia
Dennis Siver
Dorian Price
Doug Evans
Edilberto de Oliveira
Fabrício Werdum
Floyd Sword
Frankie Edgar
George Sotiropoulos
Gray Maynard
Heath Herring

Houston Alexander
Jared Rollins
Jason Black
Jason Gilliam
Jason Reinhardt
Jason Tan
Jeff Cox
Jeremy Stephens
Jess Liaudin
Joe Veres
John Halverson
John Kolosci
Jon Koppenhaver
Jordan Radev
Justin McCully
Kazuhiro Nakamura
Leonard Garcia
Luiz Cane
Luke Caudillo
Lyoto Machida
Mac Danzig
Manny Gamburyan
Marcus Aurélio
Mark Bocek
Matt Arroyo
Matt Grice
Mauricio Rua

Michihiro Omigawa
Mirko Filipović
Naoyuki Kotani
Nate Diaz
Nate Mohr
Paul Georgieff
Paul Taylor
Quinton Jackson
Rameau Thierry Sokoudjou
Rex Holman
Richie Hightower
Roan Carneiro
Rob Emerson
Roman Mitichyan
Ryan Jensen
Ryo Chonan
Scott Junk
Sean Salmon
Soa Palelei
Steven Lynch
Tamdan McCrory
Terry Etim
Thiago Silva
Thiago Tavares
Tom Speer
Tomasz Drwal
Troy Mandaloniz

Events list

UFC Fight Night: Stevenson vs. Guillard

UFC Fight Night: Stevenson vs. Guillard (also known as UFC Fight Night 9) was an event held on April 5, 2007, at The Palms Casino Resort in Las Vegas, Nevada.

Results

Bonus awards
Fight of the Night: Kenny Florian vs. Dokonjonosuke Mishima
Performance of the Night: Joe Stevenson and Kurt Pelligrino

See also
 UFC
 List of UFC champions
 List of UFC events

References

Ultimate Fighting Championship by year
2007 in mixed martial arts